On 29 March 2022, a Puma helicopter belonging to the Pakistan Army's aviation division and assigned to the United Nations Organization Stabilization Mission in the Democratic Republic of the Congo (MONUSCO) crashed during a reconnaissance mission over the province of North Kivu, Democratic Republic of Congo. The crash killed all eight UN Peacekeepers on board, six from Pakistan and one each from Russia and Serbia.

Pakistan's Ambassador to the UN, Munir Akram, confirmed the identities' of the soldiers on board the helicopter.

Events
On 29 March, MONUSCO lost contact with a helicopter on a reconnaissance mission in eastern Congo, in the area around the village of Tshanzu, southeast of the more regionally important town of Rutshuru.

A search and rescue operation recovered the bodies later that day and took them to Goma, the province's capital.

The Armed Forces of the Democratic Republic of the Congo said the helicopter crash was intentionally shot down by the rebel March 23 Movement (M23), which had launched an offensive against the government shortly before the crash. M23 spokesman Willy Ngoma accused the Congolese government of lying, saying that the group suspected the military to be responsible. Fighting between the Congolese army and the M23 had been going on for several days before the crash in North Kivu.

Reactions 
Prime Minister of Pakistan Imran Khan said that he was filled with a "deep sense of horror and grief," thanking the Pakistani military for their operations.

See also 
 2022 M23 offensive

References

2022 in the Democratic Republic of the Congo
Aviation accidents and incidents in 2022
March 2022 events in Africa
Aviation accidents and incidents in the Democratic Republic of the Congo
History of the United Nations
North Kivu
Democratic Republic of the Congo–Pakistan relations
Democratic Republic of the Congo–Serbia relations
Democratic Republic of the Congo–Russia relations
M23 offensive (2022)
2022 disasters in the Democratic Republic of the Congo